Robert Gunning may refer to:

 Sir Robert Gunning, 1st Baronet (1731–1816), British diplomat
 Robert C. Gunning, professor of mathematics at Princeton University
 Robert Halliday Gunning (1818–1900), Scottish physician
 Robert Gunning, American businessman, creator of the Gunning fog index of readability
 Robert Gunning, musician, guitarist for The Infected
 Sir Robert Gunning, 3rd Baronet (1795–1862), of the Gunning baronets, MP for Northampton
 Sir Robert Charles Gunning, 8th Baronet (1901–1989), of the Gunning baronets

See also
 Gunning (disambiguation)